The 1957 Campeonato Argentino de Rugby was won by the selection of Capital that beat in the final the selection of Buenos Aires Province ("Provincia").

Rugby Union in Argentina in 1957
 The Buenos Aires Champsionship was won by C.A.S.I.
 The Cordoba Province Championship was won by Universitario
 The North-East Championship was won by Natación y Gimnasia

Knock out stages

Semifinals 

 Provincia: J. Olazábal, R. Faldutti, J. Campos, J. Berro García, J. Ramallo, M. Guyot, E. Holmgren, J. Madero, E. Mitchelstein, R. Ochoa, E. Parola, R. Dell'Acqua, F. Tosato, R. Santángelo, C. Travaglini 
 La Plata: C. Sabalzagaray, E. Vergara, H. Tiribelli, E. Brea, H. Zapettini, N. Dutil, J. Dubarry, R. La Rosa, H. Carnicero, C. Sacerdote, J. Roan, C. Olivera, R. Giner, H. Dentone, L. Gorostiaga 

 Capital: J. Genoud, E. Horan, R. Raimundez, E. Fernández del Casal, A. Ricciardello, R. Bazán, P. Felisari, S. Hogg, A. Bublath, M. Azpiroz, J. Diez, A. Dillon, E. Gaviña, C. Ezcurra, E. Hirsch. 
 Rosario: F. Cavallo, R. Abalos, G. Recagno, J. Arce, A. Drincovich, A. Robson, R. Conti, C. Kaden, J. Ramos, E. Celentano, A Colla, J. Silvetti, C. Silvestre, F. Alonso, R. Alonso

Final 

Capital: J. Genoud, J. Ricciardello, R. Raimundez, E. Fernández del Casal, E. Horan, R. Bazán, P. Felisari, S. Hogg, A. Bublath, G. Schon, J. Diez, A. Dilon, E. Gaviña, C. Ezcurra, E. Hirsch
 Provincia: J. Olazábal, R. Faldutti, J. Campos, J. Berro García, C. Ra¬mallo, M. Guyot, E. Holmgren, J. Madero, E. Mitchelstein, R. Ochoa, E. Parola, R. Dell'Acqua, F. Tosato, R. Saitángelo, C. Travaglini.

Bibliography 
 Memorias de la UAR 1957
 XIII Campeonato Argentino

Campeonato Argentino de Rugby
Argentina
rugby